Avelino Perea (born 18 July 1957) is a Spanish racing cyclist. He rode in the 1981 Tour de France.

References

External links
 

1957 births
Living people
Spanish male cyclists
Place of birth missing (living people)
People from Tolosa, Spain
Sportspeople from Gipuzkoa
Cyclists from the Basque Country (autonomous community)